is a Japanese luger. He competed in the men's singles event at the 1976 Winter Olympics.

References

1950 births
Living people
Japanese male lugers
Olympic lugers of Japan
Lugers at the 1976 Winter Olympics
Sportspeople from Tokyo